The Liturgy of St. Tikhon is one of the Divine Liturgies authorized for use by the Antiochian Western Rite Vicariate (AWRV) of the Antiochian Orthodox Christian Archdiocese of North America, itself part of the Eastern Orthodox Church. It is authorized for use in the AWRV in two English language texts—that of the Orthodox Missal and that of the Saint Andrew's Service Book.

Origins
The Liturgy of St. Tikhon was produced in the 1970s for use by Episcopalians who wished to convert to Orthodoxy but retain the liturgy to which they were accustomed. The text of the liturgy, therefore, is based upon the Episcopal Church's 1928 Book of Common Prayer (BCP), along with certain features of the Tridentine Mass (the dominant Mass of the Catholic Church prior to its reform after the Second Vatican Council), as well certain modifications to make it conform to Orthodox theology and practice, including a strengthened epiclesis and the omission of the filioque from the Nicene-Constantinopolitan Creed). 

The adaptation of the rite was the work of Joseph Angwin. The naming of the liturgy after Tikhon the Enlightener of America is based upon events that occurred when Tikhon was the ruling bishop of the American diocese of the Russian Orthodox Church. Some Episcopalians who wished to become Orthodox asked Bishop Tikhon whether they might be allowed to continue to use their Anglican liturgy, that of the American 1892 Book of Common Prayer (BCP). He sent the BCP to Moscow, where a commission was appointed to examine the issue. The final report addressed the changes that would need to be made in the BCP in order to make it suitable for Orthodox worship, but neither the commission nor Bishop Tikhon actually approved a rite.

Structure
Asperges (optional)
Collect for Purity
Summary of the Law
Kyrie eleison 
Gloria in excelsis
Collect of the Day
Epistle
Gradual
Alleluia
Gospel
Nicene-Constantinopolitan Creed
Offertory
Prayer for the whole state of Christ's Church (Intercessions)
Confession of sin and absolution
Dialogue
Preface
Sanctus
Canon
Lord's Prayer
Fraction
Agnus Dei
Prayer of Humble Access
Holy Communion
Prayer of thanksgiving after Communion
Dismissal
Blessing of the faithful
Last Gospel (Prologue of St John's Gospel)

See also
 Western Rite Orthodoxy

References
Orthodox Missal (Saint Luke's Priory Press, 1995)

External links
 Text of the Liturgy of St. Tikhon
 Russian observations on the American Prayer Book
 St. Tikhon Liturgy not Cranmerian

Eastern Orthodox liturgy
Eastern Christian liturgies